Braye may refer to:

Places
 Braye (river), a river in France
 Braye du Valle, Guernsey, the area between Guernsey and Le Clos du Valle in the Channel Islands
 Braye Harbour, the main port of Alderney, in the Channel Islands
 La Braye (Chablais Alps), a mountain in Valais, Switzerland

Communes in France
 Braye, Aisne, in the Aisne département
 Braye-en-Laonnois, in the Aisne département 
 Braye-en-Thiérache, in the Aisne département 
 Braye-sous-Faye, in the Indre-et-Loire département 
 Braye-sur-Maulne, in the Indre-et-Loire département

People with the surname
 Anne Braye, Baroness Cobham (1501–1558), daughter of Edmund Braye
 Edmund Braye, 1st Baron Braye (1484–1539)
 Dominique Braye (born 1947), French politician

Other uses
 Baron Braye, a title in the Peerage of England, of Eaton Bray in the County of Bedford

See also
 Bray (disambiguation)